Martin-Guillaume Biennais (La Cochère, April 29, 1764 – Paris, March 27, 1843) was a French goldsmith and silversmith.

Biography 

Martin-Guillaume Biennais was born in La Cochère on April 29, 1764.

After his father's death, Biennais moved to Paris in 1788, where he initially engaged in commerce; he married but was widowed after a year.

The first part of his career he dedicated mainly to goldsmithing, but after the end of the revolutionary period, he approached more to silverware, since gold and silver objects during the Napoleonic Empire could be worked and produced.

In addition to all kinds of silverware, jewelry, porcelain, religious objects, various white weapons embellished with military decorations, he produced mahogany furniture, such as chests of drawers, consoles, coffee tables, toilets and beds.

He was one of the best silversmiths in the translation of the classical style spread for Napoleon Bonaparte by his "ornatisti". While Robert Joseph Auguste gave the best of his art in the period of Louis XVI, Biennais and Jean-Baptiste-Claude Odiot proved to be the most capable interpreters of the Napoleonic model.

Of the two, however, Biennais was the most appreciated among his contemporaries, and also the most prolific.

Biennais was responsible for the execution of the insignia of Napoleon's coronation ceremony on December 2, 1804: the sword, the laurel wreath, the great necklace of the legion of honor, the Grand-Septre, the ball of the world and the hand of justice.

The work that made him famous in his time was the silver cradle made for the king of Rome, although Biennais was probably only the executor, because the design was provided by Pierre-François-Léonard Fontaine or by the other great "ornatist" of the Empire, Charles Percier.

All the other works he produced were instead designed by Biennais himself, and sometimes executed by his collaborators, as evidenced by the marks present next to his.

He made most of the silver service for the King of Bavaria crowned in 1806, now housed in the Residenzmuseum in Munich, and his clients included the Grand Duchess of Tuscany, the King of the Netherlands, Jerome of Westphalia, Prince Camillo Borghese.

At the end of his career, in the early years of the Restoration, Biennais worked mainly for a foreign clientele.

In 1819, Biennais suddenly decided to leave the company, passing the hand to one of his main collaborators. He spent his last years in La Verrière, his country residence. Biennais died at his home in Paris on March 27, 1843, at the age of seventy-eight, surrounded by his children.

Biennais over the course of his career knew how to seize all opportunities, knowing how to respond to the demand of the new clients and at the same time capture the changes in taste, and thus proved to be at ease in the face of the difficulties of an era in which commerce was dependent on internal and external conflicts.

References

Bibliography

Related articles 

 History of art

Sister projects 

  Wikimedia Commons contiene immagini o altri file su Martin Guillaume Biennais

1843 deaths
1764 births
19th-century French people
18th-century French people
French goldsmiths